William Bendeck (January 5, 1934 – November 14, 1971) was a Bolivian rally driver who won six national titles over the course of his career. He died on November 14, 1971 in a crash during a race.

References

1934 births
1971 deaths
Bolivian rally drivers
Racing drivers who died while racing
Accidental deaths in Bolivia